Saanghuro is a Nepali film. It involves the psycho-social conflict of characters that leads to unusual circumstances and raises unsolved questions. The story is built around members of a lower-middle-class family living in an urban slum. Poverty is the part of their lives and the insecurity that comes with having to worry about whether their house might collapse is ever-present. The film was directed by Joes Pandey and produced by Sameer Mainal.

Synopsis
Krishna is a paper boy, and his mother works as a sweeper. Krishna falls in love with Kamala, a domestic worker to a rich family, and the two marry. The film portrays the psychology of the newly wedded couple who are powerless to do anything about the physical distance that is imposed upon them because of his mother's constant presence in their shared room.

Cast
 Shushank Mainali as Krishna
 Deeya Maskey as Kamala 
 Aruna Karki as Krishna's Mother
 Dayahang Rai as Tika (Daya Hang Rai)
 Rabi Giri as Krishna's Father
 Gopal Acharya as Malik
 Pushpa Acharya as Malikni
 Sameer Bagale as Malik's Son
 Ishika Mainali as Malik's Daughter
 Buddhi Tamang as Nare
 Bijay Baral as Daju
 Rabindra Shahi as Police Officer
 Suresh Aire as Police Man
 Abeeral Thapa as Car Driver
 Shankar Mainali as Doctor 1 (Dr. Shankar Mainali)
 Sudeep Thapa as Doctor 2 (Dr. Sudeep Thapa)

Awards 
 National Film Awards 2014 - winning three categories: Best Film; Best Actor (Shushank Mainali); and Best Screenplay (Bimod Paudel)
 NEFTA Film Awards 2014 - winning two categories: Best Actor in a Character Role (Dayahang Rai); and Best Actress in a Character Role (Aruna Karki)
 SAARC Film Festival 2014 in Colombo - two prizes: the film was awarded silver medal (second place); and the director Joes Pandey was awarded the special jury award.
 Saanghuro is the first Nepalese film to be telecasted on a major international TV channel (Channel 4, U.K.).

See also 
 List of Nepalese films

References

External links 

2013 films
Nepalese romantic drama films
2010s Nepali-language films
Nepali film award winners